Ting-Chao Chou (born 1938 in Taiwan, Chinese name: 周廷潮) is a Chinese American theoretical biologist, pharmacologist, cancer researcher and inventor. His 353 scientific papers have been cited in 40,108 times in over 1,469 biomedical journals as of October 15, 2022. He derived the median-effect equation (MEE) from the physico-chemical principle of the mass-action law, and introduced the median-effect plot in 1976. With Paul Talalay of the Johns Hopkins University School of Medicine, he derived the combination index equation (CIE) for multiple drug effect interactions, and introduced the concept of combination index (CI) for quantitative definition of synergism (CI<1), additive effect (CI=1), and antagonism (CI>1) using computerized simulations. This article has received 7,731 citations internationally in a broad spectrum of journals. Since all terms of MEE and CIE are dimensionless relativity ratio thus generally applicable regardless in vitro, in animals and in clinical trials, or physical states, resulting in econo-green bioresearch and new drug evaluation and bio-development. This integrated theory and algorithms allow conducting small number of dose-data points, conservation of laboratory animals and reducing the number of patients in clinical trials. Consequently, this allows saving time and cost and resources as well as increasing efficiency and cost-effectiveness in medical, pharmaceutical research and new drug development with automated computer simulation. With colleagues, T.C. Chou is inventor/co-inventor of 40 U.S. Patents, mainly for anticancer agents. He was induced to Johns Hopkins Society of Scholars in 2019.

Biography
Chou was born in Changgangling Village, Hukou Township, Hsinchu County, Taiwan on September 9, 1938, to Chao-Yun Chou and Sheng-Mei Chen.

Ancestry
His birthplace in Taiwan is Chou family's ancestral hall with a large insignia on the center "濓溪第:" (The Lianxi Place), "汝南堂" (Rue-nan Tarn), listing the family tree for 298 years. "Chou (Zhou) Lianxi" is Chou Tun-i's posthumous name. Chou Tun-i (1017-1073) (周敦頤) was a Neo-Confucian philosopher and cosmologist of the Northern Song Dynasty.  His brief essay On Praising Lotus Flower (愛蓮說) was recited by many hundred millions of school children since it was selected in the standard high school textbook in both mainland China and Taiwan. T.C. Chou is an eighth-generation descendant of the Hakka Stream moving from Zhaozhou in Guangdong to Taiwan during the first year of Yongzheng Emperor of Ching Dynasty in 1723.

Education
Under Japan's rule of Taiwan 1895–1945, the Chou family established a private family school teaching Chinese characters and classics. His father was the teacher.  After his father died, the widowed mother sent him to Hsin-Chu Normal School affiliated primary school with three-hour round-trip daily commute in the sixth grade.  After the Taiwan Provincial Hsinchu High School, he entered Kaohsiung Medical University majoring in pharmaceutical sciences where he graduated summa cum laude.  He was accepted by the Pharmacological Institute of National Taiwan University College of Medicine and received the master's degree under the mentorship of Chen-Yuan Lee, Director of the institute, and Dean of the Medical School. In 1965, he received a full scholarship from Yale University where he devoted to the mathematical aspects of quantitative biology. He received a Ph.D. degree with high honors. He did a postdoctoral fellowship at the Johns Hopkins University School of Medicine under Chairman of the Pharmacology Department, Paul Talalay, during 1970–1972.

In 1972 he joined the Laboratory of Pharmacology at Memorial Sloan Kettering Cancer Center (MSKCC) in New York City as an assistant professor, affiliated to Cornell University Graduate School of Medical Sciences.  He became a Member and Professor in 1988. After 40 years of service at MSKCC, he retired on June 1, 2013, from the Directorship of Preclinical Pharmacology Core Laboratory, Molecular Pharmacology & Chemistry Program of MSKCC, and established the PD Science LLC in 2013 in Paramus, New Jersey, to promote MAL based biodynamics, pharmacodynamics, combination index, and bioinformatics [MAL-BD/PD/CI/BI] theory and application.

Publication and citation metrics

Peer-reviewed articles
T.C. Chou's 353 publications are listed in Web of Science. The peer reviewed articles have been cited 40,108 scientific papers published in over 1,469 bio-medical journals as of October 14, 2022. Mr. Chou has a H-index of 75 and i10-index of 285.

Other publications
Inventor/ co-inventor of 40 US patents.

Theory, algorithm and definition

The Median-Effect Equation
The median-effect equation (MEE) of the mass-action law (MAL) was delivered by Chou in 1976 through the derivation of over 300 rate equations of enzyme dynamics, patten analysis, combination analysis, followed by mathematical induction and deduction.

The relativity ratio of the fraction affected (fa) vs the fraction unaffected (fu) is equal to the dose (D) vs the median-effect dose (Dm) to the mth power, where Dm signifies potency and m signifies the sigmodicity (shape) of the dose-effect curve. This median-effect equation, i.e.  where fa + fu = 1, is the unified form for the Michaelis-Menten equation for enzyme substrate saturation, the Hill equation for ligand occupancy at high order, the Henderson-Hasselbalch equation for pH ionization, and the Scatchard equation for the receptor binding.  Thus, the half-affected (Dm) is equivalent to half-saturated (Km), the half-occupied (K), half-ionized (pK) and half-bound and half-free (Kd).  MEE is the simplest possible form for all the above equations in biochemistry and biophysics. The "median" is the common-link for single and multiple ligand interactions, and the universal reference point for the first-order and higher order dynamics.

Median-effect plot
Also introduced by Chou in 1976 was the median-effect plot which is a plot of log (D) vs log [(fa)/(1-fa)] or log [(fa)/(fu)] yields a straight line with slope (m) and the x-intercept of log (Dm), where Dm equals to the anti-log of the x-intercept.  This unique theory holds true for all dose-effect curves that follows the physico-chemical principle of the mass-action law, for all entities regardless of the first-order or higher-order dynamics, and regardless of unit or mechanism of actions. MEE is derived by system analysis using enzyme kinetics and mathematical inductions and deductions where hundreds of mechanism specific individual equations are reduced to a single general equation. Both left and right sides of the MEE are dimensionless relativity ratio. When the m and Dm are determined, the full dose-effect curve is defined. Since the median-effect plot yields straight lines, the theoretical minimum of only two data points allow the drawing of the full dose-effect curve. This fundamental revelation defies the common held belief that two data points cannot draw a defined does-effect curve, since MAL algorithm adds two default points: does zero and Dm as the universal reference point. The main significance of MEE is the mediation that "Dose" and "Effect" or "Mass" and "Function" are interchangeable. The unified general MAL theory-based "top-down" approach [MAL-BD/PD/CI/BI] is opposite and yet the complimentary alternative to the traditional specific observations/statistics-based "bottom-up" approach for scientific research and development.

Combination index theorem
The combination index (CI) concept was introduced by Chou T.C. and Talalay P. in 1984. The derived  combination index equation for two drugs is:

Where (Dx)1 is for (D)1 "alone" that inhibits a system x%, and (Dx)2 is for (D)2 "alone" that inhibits a system x% whereas in the numerator, (D)1 + (D)2, "in combination" also inhibit x%.  Note that the denominators of the last two terms are the expression of MEE.  The CI Value quantitatively defines synergism (CI<1), additive effect (CI=1) and antagonism (CI>1).

Combination index Plot
Based on the above MEE and CI algorithms, a plot of CI values at different effect levels (fa's) can be determined by computer simulation (e.g.  CompuSyn or CalcuSyn software, www. Combosyn.com, free download). Entering a series of "dose (D) and effect (fa)" into computer for each drug alone and their combinations, the software will automatically simulate the CI values at different fa levels in seconds, based on the CI algorithm. This plot is also called the Fa-CI plot or the Chou-Talalay plot. Depending on the experimental design, the combination mixtures can be at constant ratio or at non-constant ratios. The CI equations for three or more drug combinations have also been derived and can be subjected to computer simulation.

The CI theorem is developed for drugs (or effector entities) regardless of mechanism of actions, and regardless of dynamic orders and or the units of each drug in the combination. The method has been applied in the combination of anti-cancer drugs, anti-HIV agents, drug-radiation, and traditional Chinese herbal medicines. On March 16, 2016, the publisher/global website, Elsevier had a news release indicated "Chou & Talalay paper from 1984 makes history".

Isobolograms
The idea of isobologram, i.e. the equi-effective curve at various concentrations or doses of two drugs, has been around for a century.  However, only until 1984 the formal derivation of its equation in the general form was introduced by Chou and Talalay.  The isobol equation is just a special case of the CI equation. Thus automated computerized construction of either the classic isobologram (at constant ratio combinations) or the normalized isobologram (at non-constant ratio combination) can be performed in seconds using CompuSyn software. In addition, the isobol method is now amendable for three or more drug combinations. Both Fa-CI plot and isobologram yield identical conclusion of synergism or antagonism.  The Fa-CI plot is effect-oriented whereas isobol is dose-oriented.  Both graphics can be considered two-sides of the same coin.  However, Fa-CI plot is visually more convenient to use than isobologram since data point over crowding in isobologram at various effect levels can be avoided.

The Dose-Reduction Index (DRI)
The DRI is a measure of how many folds the dose of each drug in a synergistic combination may be reduced, at a given effect level, compared with the doses of each drug alone. The inverted terms in the CI equation, are the DRIs for the corresponding individual drugs in the combination. The reduced dose which will reduce toxicity at the increased effect would lead to beneficial clinical consequences. The algorithm and computerized simulation of the DRI plot at different effect levels (i.e. the Fa-DRI plot or Chou-Martin plot) has been available using the CompuSyn software. DRI=1 indicates no dose reduction, whereas DRI>1 and <1 indicate favorable and unfavorable dose-reduction, respectively.

The Polygonogram
Taking the advantage of facile CI determination, a new simple graphic representation of three or more drug combinations has been introduced by T.C. Chou and J. Chou in 1998. This method allows visual inspection of two-to-n drug combinations in the same circular frame which can be used to project the plausible semi-quantitative projection of what would happen at the higher numbers of drug combinations, form the low numbers of drug combinations.  Using heavy red solid lines representing strong synergism and heavy blue broken lines representing strong antagonism, and thinner solid or broken lines for weaker interactions, a grading system can be established.  It is easy to obtain the overall perspectives for planning the cocktail design of multiple drug combinations. The polygonogram graphics for five anticancer drugs with different mechanism of actions has been featured on the front-cover of May 2011 issue of Integrative Biology, published by the Royal Society of Chemistry, Cambridge UK.

Applications of the theory
With the median-effect equation as the unified theory of the mass-action law and its combination index theorem for multiple effector interactions, these algorithms can be applied to virtually all aspects of quantitative biology and medical sciences as shown in over 1,469 different bio-medical journals. The conventional approach of dose-effect analysis in the past centuries has used numerous data points to draw the empirical dose-effect curve to best fit the available data by least square regression or other statistical means.  This old approach is under the premises of assuming dose and effect relationships are random events. By contrast, the MEE theory is to use small number (usually 3–7) of data points to fit the mass-action law to yield its parameters (i.e. m, Dm and r), and to lineage all dose-effect curves with the automated median-effect plot. This led to "the theory of minimum of two data points" for easily defining the dose-effect curve with the m and Dm parameters.

Econo-green bio-research

Minimum two dose data points theory
The revelation that all mass-action law based dose-effect curves can be transformed into straight lines with the median-effect plot leads to the theory that the theoretical minimum of two data points are required to define the entire dose-effect curve.  In conjunction with the median-effect principle of the mass-action law, the referred "two data" points actually has the third data point at dose zero.  In addition, the median-effect dose (Dm) is the fourth point which serves as the universal reference point and the common link to all dynamic orders.  T.C. Chou has not contemplated to use only two data points for experimentation due to the fact that it requires highly accurate measurement and low variability for the high r values. This mass-action theory leads to a green revolution in bio-medical research and effective and efficient drug development, as manifested in Chou's laboratory and elsewhere, in animal studies and in clinical trials.

Computer software and utilities
The major applications of the drug combinations are against the most dreadful diseases such as cancer and AIDS as indicated in the citation metrics. Broad application includes drug-radiation combination, combination of insecticides and combinations of different modalities of effectors at different combination ratios, schedules and regimens. For single entity or drug, it calculate mass-action law parameters such as Dm values (IC50, ED50, LD50, ICx, EDx and LDx, etc.), m values (shape of dose-effect curves and dynamic orders) with computerized automation.

Other applications include: (i) Low-dose risk assessment of carcinogens, toxic substances and radiation, singly or in combination for environmental protection; (ii) Agricultural utilization of insecticides, and interaction of environmental factors; (iii) Topological analysis of receptor binding site for exclusivity and competitiveness; (iv) Calculation of Ki from IC50; (v) conservation of laboratory animals in research; and (vi) Efficient design of drug combination clinical trials using small number of patients, and thereby reducing time and cost.

Patents
U.S. Patents: 
Collaboration of pharmacologists with organic chemists and the employment of the mass-action law principle resulted in 40 U.S. patents, of which one is for the solo inventor.

Some patents with promising utilities are selected for international patent applications. These include synthetic microtubule targeting epothilone compounds against solid tumors and leukemias, such as Fludelone and Iso-Oxazole-Fludelone; Immunosuppressants for organ transplantation, such as Ardeemins and Ningalins, and synthetic cyto-protective Panaxytriols (inspired by Chinese/Korea ginseng) for reducing chemotherapy-induced toxicities such as body weight loss, peripheral neuropathy, alopecia, and death, and alleviation of radiation-induced toxicities.

Illustration of ancient philosophy
The algorithms of the median-effect equation and the combination index theorem of the physico-chemical principle of the mass-action law and their computer simulation offer the new interpretation/illustration of the ancient Chinese philosophy. This revelation of correspondence and complementarity have been presented or published at the following major national or international philosophical congress, conference, forum, or symposium: (i) American Philosophical Association East Annual Meeting, Baltimore, MD 12/28/2007; (ii) World Congress of Philosophy, Seoul, Korea 8/3/2008; (iii) Peking University School of Life Science and Department of Philosophy, Beijing, China 10/24/2008; (iv) 16th International Conference of Chinese Philosophy sponsored by International Society of Chinese Philosophy, Taipei, Taiwan 7/8-15/2009; (v) 13th Yijing World Congress, Wuxi, China 6/14/2010; (vi) 7th International Forum on the Development of Traditional Chinese Medicine, Tianjin, China 9/21-23/2011; (vii) Bio-IT World Europe Bio Informatics 2011, Hanover, Germany 10/11-13/2011.

•	Confucian Doctrine of the Mean (i-iii, vii): Median is the universal link

•	Harmony and Daoism (v, vi, vii): Harmony is pure non-competitiveness

•	Wuji er Taiji and Wu-Hsin (i, ii, v, vi): Material dynamics and equilibrium

•	Fu Xi Ba Gua (ii, iii, v): Entity, time, space, vector, order and dynamics

http://www.pdcnet.org/wcp22/content/wcp22_2008_0002_0021_0039 [World Congress of Philosophy, 2008,  Seoul]
 http://philpapers.org/rec/CHOANL   [Philpapers  online blogs]
 https://www.nature.com/articles/npre.2008.2064.2(Nature Precedings, npre.2008.2031.1 ]    [GPS Bio-Informatics by Chou] 
 http://www.yijing.co.uk/conferences/2010-china/talks.html  [Yijing World Conference- 2010. Wuxi, China. Press Release]. (Honorary Guest/Speaker)
 http://tingchaochou.blogspot.com/     [Chou's  M-theory]
 https://web.archive.org/web/20181214070735/http://pkunews.pku.edu.cn/zdlm/2008-10/21/content_130609.htm  [Peking University Speech, 10/24/2008]

Other Publications
1.  Book and other websites
 http://www.gbv.de/dms/bs/toc/016060059.pdf   [Book, Academic Press, 1991, Chou & Rideout, editors]
 https://synapse.mskcc.org/synapse/people/7144-TingChao_Chou    [MSKCC Chou Web Site]
 https://hub.jhu.edu/2019/04/10/society-of-scholars-induction-ceremony/
 https://gsas.yale.edu/news/ting-chao-chou-70-phd-inducted-society-scholars-johns-hopkins

2.  The Unified Theory
  (Cited 452 times)
  (Cited 230 times) (Chou - Talalay Theory, 1977).
  
 
  
 http://www.nature.com/nm/journal/v6/n2/full/nm0200_200.html   [Nature Medicine 6:200-206, 2000]    [Cited 890 times as of 5/5/2017]
 (Journal Inauguration First Article)
 http://regulatoryaffairs.pharmaceuticalconferences.com/speaker/2015/ting-chao-chou-pd-science-llc-usa   [Pharmaceutical Regulatory Affairs -Keynote Speech, Orlando, FL  Aug..3  2015]
 http://www.worldjournal.com/3369299/article-《人物》科學家周廷潮-理論引用世界第一/    [World Journal Weekly Article about Chou's Theoretical Work, August 9, 2015]  (in Chinese)

3.  Econo-Green Bio-Research and Computer Software
 http://www.bio-itworldexpoeurope.com/bio-it_europe_content.aspx?id=106874&libID=106831    [Bio-It World 2012, Featured Speaker for Drug Discovery Informatics, Hanover, Germany]
 http://www.worldcat.org/title/dose-effect-analysis-with-microcomputers/oclc/20772177   [Software by J.Chou & TC Chou, Biosoft, Cambridge, UK, 1985]
 http://www.biosoft.com/w/calcusyn.htm    [CalcuSyn Software by Chou & Hayball, 1998,  Biosoft, Cambridge, UK]
 http://www.combosyn.com/    [CompuSyn Software by Chou & Martin, 2005, Combosyn, Inc., Paramus, NJ. Free download.  2012]

4.  The 40 U.S. Patents
 http://patents.justia.com/search?q=Ting-Chao+Chou&page=3  [Listing]
 http://radaris.com/p/Ting-Chao/Chou/    [Partial Listing]
 http://www.faqs.org/patents/inventor/ting-chao-chou-paramus-us-1/ [Statistics]
 https://archive.today/20130923161420/http://www.patentstorm.us/patents/8513429/description.html   [US Patent on Epothilones, Issued 8/20/2013]
 
 http://patentscope.wipo.int/search/en/WO2008103916   [Panaxytriols Patent]

References

External links
 https://www.journals.elsevier.com/advances-in-biological-regulation/news/-chou-talalay-paper-from-1984-makes-history [Chou & Talalay paper from 1984 makes history. Elservier Press Release 3.16.2016]
 https://www.nature.com/articles/npre.2008.2064.2    [T.C. Chou, The Mass-Action Law for Bio-Informatics. Nature Precedings, 7/22/2008]
 http://laoyouji000.blog.sohu.com/102704065.html   [Comments on Chou's Speech in Beijing by Muyu in Sohu Blog, in Chinese]
 http://libgallery.cshl.edu/items/show/32731  [Chou's letter to Prof. James D. Watson. 10/6/1974, Cold Spring Harbor Laboratory Archives Repository]
 https://www.mskcc.org/blog/finding-treatments-nature   [MSKCC News]
 http://blogs.rsc.org/ib/2011/05/05/hot-one-equation-to-lead-the-way-to-greener-biomedical-sciences/      [Integrative Biology Blogs, Royal Society of Chemistry, Cambridge, UK]
 http://www.bio-itworldexpo.com/Bio-It_Europe_Content.aspx?id=106874&libID=106831   [Featured Speech BioIT World 2012. Hanover, Germany, on Drug Discovery Informatics]
 http://regulatoryaffairs.pharmaceuticalconferences.com/speaker/2015/ting-chao-chou-pd-science-llc-usa     [ Chou Opening Keynote Speech]
 周廷潮  [Chou TC Chinese Wikipedia 2017] 
 http://sp.mc.ntu.edu.tw/sopPage.php?malangue=&myrub=news&flanum=72884116445NWstLUUDpXSM6 [Natl. Taiwan Univ-P Seminar Announcement 11/14/2016] 
 http://www.nibs.ac.cn/newsshow.php?cid=0&sid=14&id=408 [China Natl. Inst. Biol. Sci., Beijing Seminar announcement 10/23/2008]

1938 births
Cancer researchers
Living people
Taiwanese emigrants to the United States
Taiwanese people of Hakka descent
People from Hsinchu
Kaohsiung Medical University alumni
National Taiwan University alumni
Hakka scientists
Yale Graduate School of Arts and Sciences alumni